Circles (stylized in lower case) is the second studio album by American Christian singer and songwriter Dante Bowe. Bethel Music released the album on March 26, 2021. The album contains guest appearances by Trevor Jackson, Lael, and Bizzle. The album was produced by Lael, Ben Schofield, and Stephen Blake Kanicka.

The album was supported by the release of "Joyful" as a single. The album debuted at number seven on the US Top Gospel Albums chart.

Background
Circles is Dante Bowe's second studio album, following his independent debut release, Son of a Father (2017). and his first label debut project, since signing with Bethel Music in 2019. Bowe began songwriting for the album in 2020, in the aftermath of his grandfather's passing and consumed by the 2020 Black Lives Matter protests, working with Lael and Ben Schofield in the production of the album.

Bowe said that the album title was drawn from the song "Circles", saying: "I wrote that song because I felt like last year, and still a little bit this year, that people feel like they’ve been spinning around in circles, dizzy and out of control." Bowe said that the song's message is that God is "the God of the circles," and he felt the song represented the whole project.

Music and lyrics
Sonically, Bowe drew inspiration from the music of his childhood—gospel, '90s R&B, hip-hop, and soul. The lyrics of the album revolve around "themes of gratitude, forgiveness, perseverance, and understanding."

Artwork
The photo for the album cover was shot by Donté Maurice. Bowe had initially wanted the album cover to be in a field, but Maurice suggested that the photo be done in a studio, with Bowe jumping off a trampoline to appear as though he jumping in the sky.

Release and promotion
On March 1, 2021, Dante Bowe announced that he will be releasing his second studio album, Circles, on March 26. He released "Joyful" as the lead single from Circles on March 12, 2021. On March 19, 2021, Circles was availed for digital pre-order.

Critical reception

Timothy Yap of JubileeCast praised the album, saying, "With most songs clocking in at the 2 to 3 minute mark, most of the entries are punchy without much wasted notes.  Though there are a couple of songs ("Over and Over" and "Keep Going") that border on the side of the ordinary, this record is superb. It is diverse, interesting, and it also hits you in the heart. "Love is in the Air," in particular, is the bomb." Reviewing for Jesus Freak Hideout, Andrew Blauwkamp wrote a positive review, saying: "I was pleasantly surprised with how creative and well-produced this album was. This is Dante Bowe's album through and through. He does nothing but shine on each track. Give Circles a spin and enjoy each minute of this musical experience."

Commercial performance
In the United States, Circles debuted at No. 7 on the Top Gospel Albums chart.

Track listing

Charts

Weekly charts

Year-end charts

Release history

References

External links
 

2021 albums